Bentonville is the tenth-largest city in Arkansas, United States and the county seat of Benton County. The city is centrally located in the county with Rogers adjacent to the east. The city is the birthplace of and world headquarters location of Walmart, the world's largest retailer. It is one of the four main cities in the three-county Northwest Arkansas Metropolitan Statistical Area, which is ranked 105th in terms of population in the United States with 546,725 residents in 2020, according to the United States Census Bureau. The city itself had a population of 54,164 at the 2020 Census, an increase of 53% from the 2010 Census.
Bentonville is considered to be one of the fastest growing cities in the state and consistently ranks amongst the safest cities in Arkansas.
It is included in the Fayetteville–Springdale–Rogers Metropolitan Statistical Area.

History

Early history

The area now known as Bentonville's first known use by humans was as hunting grounds by the Osage Nation who lived in Missouri. The Osage would leave their settlements to hunt in present-day Benton County for months at a time before returning to their families. White settlers first inhabited the area around 1837 and named their settlement "Osage". By this time, the Osage had ceased using the area for hunting, and the white settlers began to establish farms. Upon establishment of Benton County on September 30, 1836, Osage was deemed a suitable site for the county seat, and the town square was established as the home of county government the following year. Osage was renamed Bentonville in honor of Thomas Hart Benton, a senator from Missouri who strongly supported Arkansas statehood.

Early statehood and Civil War

Two years after Arkansas received statehood in 1836, thousands of Cherokee people from Georgia passed through Benton County as part of the Trail of Tears route to the Indian Territory in what is now Oklahoma. Although no Civil War battles were fought inside Bentonville, the city was occupied by both armies and saw almost all of its buildings burned. The city began to rebuild about a decade after incorporation on April 3, 1873, with many of these Reconstruction Era buildings today serving as the oldest structures in Bentonville.

After the war, the area established a vibrant apple industry, with Benton County becoming the leading apple producing county in the nation in 1901.

Twentieth Century 
In the 1920s and 1930s the county developed a reputation as a leader in poultry production that continued into the World War II years, and which the area still maintains today. The post war economy helped Bentonville grow, with many new businesses starting.

In 1950, Sam Walton bought the Harrison Variety Store on the Bentonville town square. He fully remodeled the building and opened "Walton’s 5 and 10 Variety Store" on March 18, 1951. This single store eventually led to the creation of Walmart, the world's largest retailer, which still strongly influences the community today.

The late twentieth and early twenty-first century has seen a dramatic reduction in the manufacturing sector in Bentonville, corresponding with an increase in tourism and entertainment focused on the natural setting and outdoor opportunities of the area as well as the Crystal Bridges Museum of American Art, which opened in 2011. This has resulted in Bentonville being the fastest growing city in Arkansas, and the larger Northwest Arkansas area one of the fastest growing in the United States.

Geography

Metropolitan area

The Northwest Arkansas region consists of three Arkansas counties: Benton, Madison, and Washington. The area had a population of 347,045 at the 2000 census which had increased to 463,204 by the 2010 Census (an increase of 33.47 percent). The Metropolitan Statistical Area does not consist of the usual principal-city-with-suburbs morphology; instead Bentonville is bordered to the east by Rogers, the north by Bella Vista, and the west by Centerton. The Northwest Arkansas National Airport is located to the southwest of Bentonville and is used to connect all of the northwest Arkansas region to the rest of the nation. For more than the last decade, Northwest Arkansas has been one of the fastest-growing regions in the United States.

Climate
Bentonville lies in the humid subtropical climate zone (Köppen Cfa) with influence from the humid continental climate type. Bentonville experiences all four seasons and does receive cold air masses from the north, however some of the Arctic masses are blocked by the higher elevations of the Ozarks. Temperatures above  are common, with a high of  occurring about once per year on average.

Demographics

2020 census

As of the 2020 United States census, there were 54,164 people, 18,223 households, and 12,212 families residing in the city.

2017
As of 2017 Bentonville had a population of 49,298.  The racial and ethnic composition of the population was 77.0% non-Hispanic white, 2.4% non-Hispanic black, 1.2% Native American, 5.8% Asian, 0.2% Pacific Islander, 3.9% from some other race and 2.5% from two or more races.  8.7% of the population was Hispanic or Latino of any race.

2000 census
As of the census of 2000, there were 19,730 people, 7,458 households, and 5,265 families residing in the city. The city grew substantially in the 1990s; the 1990 population was 11,257 and the city is expected to reach 50,000 people by the year 2030. According to the US Census, Bentonville and surrounding communities in Benton County is second in growth for Arkansas and among the 100 fastest-growing counties in the United States.

The racial makeup of the city was 90.92% White, 0.88% Black or African American, 1.33% Native American, 2.40% Asian, 0.04% Pacific Islander, 2.68% from other races, and 1.76% from two or more races.  6.07% of the population were Hispanic or Latino of any race.

The 2005 Special Census reported 24,837 Whites/non-Hispanic whites (86.8%), 2,428 Hispanics of any race (8.5%), 1,135 Asians (4.0%), and 510 Blacks/African Americans (1.8%). 

There were 7,458 households, out of which 40.1% had children under the age of 18 living with them, 55.6% were married couples living together, 11.9% had a female householder with no husband present, and 29.4% are classified as non-families by the United States Census Bureau. 24.4% of all households were made up of individuals, and 6.7% had someone living alone who was 65 years of age or older. The average household size was 2.59 and the average family size was 3.11.

In the city, the population was spread out, with 29.5% under the age of 18, 9.8% from 18 to 24, 34.2% from 25 to 44, 17.9% from 45 to 64, and 8.5% who were 65 years of age or older.  The median age was 31 years. For every 100 females, there were 93.6 males.  For every 100 females age 18 and over, there were 91.3 males.

The median income for a household in the city was $39,936, and the median income for a family was $46,558. Males had a median income of $31,816 versus $23,761 for females. The per capita income for the city was $20,831.  10.3% of the population and 7.5% of families were below the poverty line.  Out of the total people living in poverty, 13.7% are under the age of 18 and 10.9% are 65 or older.

Economy

Region
The Northwest Arkansas economy was historically based upon agriculture and poultry. In recent decades, NWA has seen rapid growth and diversification of its economy based upon the three Fortune 500 companies based there, Walmart, Tyson Foods, and J.B. Hunt, while also seeing a growing University of Arkansas and cultural amenities sector. Although impacted by the Great Recession, NWA's economy fared better than most peer metropolitan areas, the state of Arkansas and the United States overall. Between 2007 and 2013, the region saw unemployment rates significantly below those of peer regions and the national average; while also seeing a 1% net growth of jobs. The NWA gross domestic product grew 7.0% over the aforementioned time period, and bankruptcies, building permits and per capita incomes are returning to pre-Recession rates.

The professional, education and health care sectors of the Northwest Arkansas economy have been growing steadily since 2007. Between 2007 and 2013, the region has seen a growth of 8,300 jobs in the region, with 6,100 added in education and health professions and 4,300 jobs added in the leisure and hospitality jobs related to the region's cultural amenities. The government and transportation sectors have remained relatively constant between 2007 and 2013, however the manufacturing sector has seen steady decline, mirroring national averages. The construction and real estate sectors saw large declines attributable to the poor housing market during the economic downturn.

City

Bentonville has been home to Walmart since Sam Walton purchased a store on the town square in 1950 and renamed it Walton's 5 & 10. The retailer continued a rapid growth, but Helen Walton wished to remain in Bentonville to raise the family, and thus by the time Walmart became the #1 Fortune 500 in 2002, it was still based in Bentonville. The Walmart "Home Office" now includes more than 20 buildings throughout Bentonville, specifically along Walton Boulevard (US 71B) in the western part of the city. In 2017 Walmart announced their intention to construct a new central headquarters in Bentonville, consolidating many of their employees to a more centralized campus.

The impact from the Walmart Home Office is multiplied by the over 1100 prospective Walmart vendors who have established sales offices in the region. The large number of satellite offices for companies of almost every industry means a large number of transplants from around the United States live in or near Bentonville. This phenomenon impacts the culture of Bentonville in addition to the city's economy.

Bentonville is home to a growing entrepreneurial scene, with co-working spaces and startup incubators being added quickly over the last 5 years.

Culture, contemporary life, and points of interest

Bentonville's culture is a combination of a southern city, small town, global business hub, and the surrounding Northwest Arkansas metro.

Bentonville shares many of the characteristics commonly given to Arkansas as a Southern state, yet it has also absorbed minor cultural influence from the Midwest and West. Located firmly in the Mid-South, Bentonville's culture is distinct and differs from the Delta portion of the state. Many of the city's first settlers came from North Georgia, North Alabama, Kentucky, North Carolina and Tennessee, because they found the Ozarks familiar, similar to the Appalachian Mountains back home. The uplands of Arkansas, including Northwest Arkansas, did not participate in large-scale plantation farming with slaves like the Arkansas delta, instead electing to settle in small clusters, relying largely on subsistence agriculture and hunting rather than the settlement patterns common in the Midwest and Deep South. The "hillbilly" stereotype given to the Ozarks and Appalachians is largely a derivative of the difficult topography, tendency to settle in clusters, and mostly cashless self-sustaining economy found in those regions. Bentonville's large proportion of Southern Baptist and Methodist adherents does, however, reflect a trend often associated with the Deep South.

Due to Walmart's prominence in the city, Bentonville is also an international focal point for retail suppliers and other supporting businesses. According to the Bentonville-Bella Vista Chamber of Commerce, over 1,250 suppliers have offices in Northwest Arkansas in an attempt to secure or retain Walmart's business. Symbolic of Bentonville's complex culture was a cricket game played between PepsiCo and Walmart, spectated by their respective chief executives Indra Nooyi and Doug McMillon, chronicled in an article in The Wall Street Journal describing the complex Bentonville culture. The game was played on a baseball field in Bentonville not well suited for typical cricket, so the players adopted new rules. The city has a league with 18 teams and a host of fans, mostly derived from the thousands of Indian natives drawn to Bentonville by Walmart software and IT jobs. In late 2018 plans for a public cricket pitch were approved for a new park in the southwest of the city.

From the Walmart Museum on the downtown square to the over 20 buildings spread throughout the city, Walmart's Home Office has a presence throughout Bentonville. The Northwest Arkansas National Airport has direct commercial flights from many large destination cities not typical of airports its size due to the supplier community. Bentonville, and the recently opened Bentonville West (located in Centerton) High Schools, have programs to assist the sizable transient student population, including international students, for those who have recently relocated to the area.

Arts and culture

Crystal Bridges Museum of American Art is a $450,000,000 museum of American Art designed by architect Moshe Safdie located within walking distance of downtown Bentonville. The museum was founded by Alice Walton in 2011 and contains many masterpieces from all eras of American art, including many works from Walton's private collection.

Other points of interest include:
 Walmart Museum: Located adjacent to Sam Walton's original Walton's Five and Dime which serves as a visitor's center.
 Museum of Native American History: Museum showcasing Native American history, art, and culture.
 21C Museum Hotel: Public museum and hotel featuring works of the 21st Century.
 Scott Family Amazeum: An interactive children's museum
The Momentary: A contemporary art museum and performance venue
Bentonville Public Library

Beginning in 2015, the Bentonville Film Festival has been held annually the first week of May in Downtown Bentonville. Over 85,000 attendees take part in this week-long event.

Historic districts and properties

Bentonville contains over 30 listings on the National Register of Historic Places (NRHP), the official federal list of districts, sites, buildings, structures, and objects deemed worthy of preservation.

The city contains two residential historic districts, the Third Street Historic District and West Central Avenue Historic District. Both districts contain historic residences notable for their architectural styles and contributions to the city's early history. Together, over 40 houses are listed as contributing properties. Preeminent individual residential listings within the historic districts include the Craig-Bryan House, Elliott House, James A. Rice House and the Rice House on "A" Street. Residential listing elsewhere in the city include the Peel Mansion Museum, Stroud House and Col. Young House.

Also included in the NRHP are historic public structures, such as the Benton County Courthouse, Benton County Jail, Bentonville High School, commercial structures such as the Benton County National Bank, Massey Hotel, Roy's Office Supply Building, and the Terry Block Building, and two cemeteries.

Additionally, a confederate monument installed in 1908 by a local United Daughters of the Confederacy chapter. On June 1, 2020, local residents held a non-violent demonstration at the statue in solidarity with the Black Lives Matter movement, until later that night, when the Benton County Sheriff's "mobile field force" ended the demonstration by deploying tear-gas on the assembled crowd and arresting several people. The statue was later removed in September 2020.

Parks and trail system

Over  of city parks throughout the city offer educational, recreational and outdoors opportunities to park visitors. The largest park surrounds Lake Bella Vista and includes a popular perimeter fitness trail and disc golf course. Memorial park features the Melvin Ford Aquatic Center as well as baseball, basketball, tennis, volleyball, skateboard, softball and soccer facilities. The four baseball fields at Merchants Baseball Park have hosted the Bentonville Youth Baseball League since its inception in 1954. Park Springs Park was created in the 1890s following the discovery of two springs with purported healing powers. The Burns Arboretum/Nature Trail was added in 1996 and includes a State Champion tree.

Trails in Bentonville vary from small fitness trails to long mountain bike trails to the regional Razorback Greenway depending upon topography, intended use and city planning. The Northwest Arkansas Razorback Regional Greenway, a  primarily off-road mixed use trail connecting the Northwest Arkansas region, runs through Bentonville near Bentonville High School, the Walmart Home Office, and Crystal Bridges on its way to Lake Bella Vista to the north. 
The Crystal Bridges Trail is a  trail between downtown Bentonville and the museum, built by the museum and donated to the city. Public art and sculptures line the trail, which passes through Compton Gardens on its way to the museum's southeast entrance. After passing by an overlook where trail users can view the museum from a bluff, the Crystal Bridges Trail connects to the museum's  trail system. The city also has several trails connecting main streets, parks and neighborhoods throughout the city.

Bentonville is well regarded as a mountain biking destination providing more than 28 miles of award-winning mountain bike trails, earning a Silver Ride Center designation from the International Mountain Bicycling Association and hosting multiple cycling events throughout the year.

Outside Magazine listed Bentonville as one of its best towns of 2017, especially noting the city's bicycle trails and art scene. Bentonville has been recognized as a Bicycle Friendly Community by the League of American Bicyclists since 2012.

Government and politics

Mayor–city council
Bentonville operates within the mayor-city council form of government. The mayor is elected by a citywide election to serve as the Chief Executive Officer (CEO) of the city by presiding over all city council meetings, laws are enforced and taxpayer funds are spent prudently. Once elected, the mayor also allocates duties to city employees. Mayors serve four-year terms and can serve unlimited terms.

The city council is the unicameral legislative body of the city, consisting of eight members. The council's duties include balancing the city's budget and passing ordinances. The body also controls the representatives of specialized city commissions underneath their jurisdiction. Members are elected at-large with no term limits and represent individual wards. Council members must live in the ward they represent.

Citizen boards, commissions, and committees 
Citizen input is welcomed through the use of various specialized groups. Although some positions are appointed by the mayor, many consist of volunteers. Requirements include the applicant is a resident of Bentonville and submission of an application in order to gain access to any of Bentonville's 8 city boards. These range from appointed positions at the Planning Commission to the Bentonville Public Art Advisory Committee to the Bentonville Library Advisory Board.

Judicial system 
The Bentonville District Court handles criminal, civil, small claims, and traffic matters within the city limits.  In addition, the Court handles Civil and Small Claims cases when there is proper jurisdiction. The current elected District Judge presides over all cases. Ray Bunch is the current Bentonville District Court Judge.
The 19th Judicial Circuit Court covers Benton County as a whole and operates out of the Benton County Courthouse in Downtown Bentonville with Bentonville serving as the County Seat.

Politics 
The current mayor is Stephanie Orman, first elected in 2018. Prior to becoming mayor, Orman served as a member of the City Council as well as serving in and leading several non-profit organizations.

Voters in Bentonville tend to lean conservative. The current state representatives that serve districts containing portions of Bentonville are Republican Rep. Jim Dotson, Republican Rep. Rebecca Petty, Republican Rep Kim Hendren, and Republican Rep. Dan Douglas. The current state senator that serves the district containing Bentonville is Republican Sen. Bart Hester.

Education

Public elementary and secondary education in the majority of the city limits is provided by Bentonville Public Schools, leading to graduation at Bentonville High School or Bentonville West High School.

Small portions of the city to the east are zoned to Rogers Public Schools.

Haas Hall Academy and Northwest Arkansas Classical Academy are the two public charter schools. The Thaden School opened in 2017 and is the first independent high school in the city.

Bentonville Adventist School, associated with the Seventh-day Adventist Church, provides education services for kindergarten through eighth grade.

The nearest Catholic high school is Ozark Catholic Academy in Tontitown.

Bentonville is home to the Northwest Arkansas Community College (NWACC), a public two-year college that provides students undergraduate, vocational, career and technical education courses.

The Bentonville Public Library System consists of one central library, located at 405 S. Main Street, which provides residents with access to print books, publications and multimedia content, as well as a satellite location at the Bentonville Community Center in the southwestern section of the city.

Infrastructure

Transportation

Major highways

 Interstate 49
 US Route 71
 US Route 71 Business
 Highway 12
 Highway 72
 Highway 102
 Highway 112

The major through route in Bentonville is Interstate 49/US 71. This fully controlled access, four-lane expressway is a discontinuous piece of a route ultimately planned to connect Kansas City, Missouri to New Orleans, Louisiana. Formerly designated as Interstate 540 with the re-designation as Interstate 49 being granted by the U S Department of Transportation Federal Highway Administration on March 28, 2014, the highway became the first freeway in the area when it was completed in the 1990s to relieve the former US 71 (now US 71B) of a much-increased demand of through travelers following the unanticipated and rapid growth of the Northwest Arkansas metro. Future plans for the I-49 corridor include completion of a freeway segment through between Fort Smith and Texarkana. The Bella Vista Bypass to the north was completed and opened in late 2021.

Public transit 
Bentonville has one major provider of public transportation, Ozark Regional Transit, which operates in Benton/Washington Counties and is a broad bus-based fixed-route regional transit system.

Aviation 
The Bentonville Municipal Airport and Louise M. Thaden Field is owned by the city and serves general aviation. The nearest airport for commercial flights is Northwest Arkansas Regional Airport (XNA), located approximately 12 miles southwest of the city center, which opened in 1998.

Utilities

Water
The City of Bentonville owns and operates a municipal water system that provides services to industrial, commercial and residential customers. Drinking water is purchased and pumped from the Beaver Water District treatment plant in Lowell.

Notable people

 James Henderson Berry, U.S. senator and 14th governor of Arkansas
 Asa Hutchinson, 46th Governor of Arkansas
 Tim Hutchinson, former U.S. Senator
 Malik Monk, professional basketball player for the Sacramento Kings
 Doug McMillon, CEO of Walmart
 Lee Seamster, Chief Justice of the Arkansas Supreme Court; mayor of Bentonville, 1921–1922
 Louise Thaden, aviation pioneer, holder of numerous aviation records, and the first woman to win the Bendix Trophy
 Dwight Tosh, Republican member of the Arkansas House of Representatives
 Karri Turner, actress on the adventure/drama television show JAG
 Jim Walton, 17th richest person in the world, youngest son of Sam Walton

References

External links
 

 
 Encyclopedia of Arkansas History & Culture entry: Bentonville (Benton County)

 
Cities in Arkansas
Populated places established in 1873
Cities in Benton County, Arkansas
County seats in Arkansas
Northwest Arkansas
1836 establishments in Arkansas